Route 30 is a city route in Winnipeg, Manitoba. It runs from Highway 1/Route 135 (Fermor Avenue) to Route 37 (Nairn Avenue). 

The route follows Archibald Street north from Fermor Avenue (Route 135), passing under the CPR mainline, to Delsalaberry Avenue, where the name changes to Watt Street (formerly Archibald Street North). It continues north for one block to Nairn Avenue (Route 37). Historically, the CPR mainline was the boundary between the Parishes of Saint Boniface and Kildonan.

This principal arterial road runs through primarily industrial areas east of downtown, in St. Boniface. With the exception of a short stretch near the intersection of Fermor Avenue, the speed limit is 60 km/h (35 mph).

Major intersections

References 

030